Ropica varipennis is a species of beetle in the family Cerambycidae. It was described by Pascoe in 1859.

References

varipennis
Beetles described in 1859